"All of My Life" is a song by the English-Australian rock group Bee Gees, written and sung by Barry Gibb, which was used as the B-side of "Monday's Rain". This song was recorded during the sessions for their second album Spicks and Specks and appeared on the early pressings of the album, entitled Monday's Rain as the first song on side two. When the album's name was changed to Spicks and Specks, the song was omitted.

The song eventually saw album release by Atco Records on Rare, Precious and Beautiful, Volume 2, a 1970 album of early recordings by the Gibb brothers, including some recorded with Colin Petersen.

Its debut on CD was released on the compilation Brilliant from Birth, released in 1998 only in Australia.  A cover has been done by the Philippine band Side A.

Personnel
 Barry Gibblead vocal, guitar
 Robin Gibbharmony and backing vocal, guitar
 Maurice Gibbguitar, bass, backing vocal
 Colin Petersendrums
 Steve Kipnerbacking vocal

References

Bee Gees songs
Demis Roussos songs
Songs written by Barry Gibb
1966 songs